Matti Elias Kuosmanen (born 2 September 1995) is a Finnish Greco-Roman wrestler. He is a two-time bronze medalist at the European Wrestling Championships. He also competed at the World Wrestling Championships in 2017, 2018 and 2019.

He represented Finland at the 2020 Summer Olympics in Tokyo, Japan. He competed in the men's 130 kg event.

Career 

He represented Finland at the 2019 Military World Games held in Wuhan, China and he won the silver medal in the 97 kg event.

In 2020, he lost his bronze medal match in the 97 kg event at the European Wrestling Championships held in Rome, Italy.

In 2021, he won one of the bronze medals in the 97 kg event at the Grand Prix Zagreb Open held in Zagreb, Croatia.

Achievements

References

External links 
 

Living people
Place of birth missing (living people)
Finnish male sport wrestlers
Wrestlers at the 2019 European Games
European Games competitors for Finland
European Wrestling Championships medalists
Wrestlers at the 2020 Summer Olympics
1995 births
Olympic wrestlers of Finland
21st-century Finnish people